Related articles are  SAN and  NAS.

Storage Area Network hardware platforms